Smith Hempstone (February 1, 1929–November 19, 2006) was a journalist, author, and the United States ambassador to Kenya in 1989–93. He was a vocal proponent of democracy, advocating free elections for Kenya.

Biography
Hempstone attended George Washington University and graduated from the University of the South. He was a U.S. Marine in the Korean War (1950–52), leaving as a captain.

He did radio rewrite for the Associated Press in Charlotte, North Carolina, (1952). He was a reporter at the Louisville Times, Louisville, Kentucky (1953), rewrite man at National Geographic, Washington, D.C. (1954), then a reporter at the Washington Star (1955–56). He was a fellow of the Institute of Current World Affairs in Africa (1956–60). He served as a foreign correspondent for the Chicago Daily News in Africa (1961–64) and in Latin America (1965). He was a foreign correspondent for the Washington Star in Latin America (1966), and Europe, (1967–69). He was associate editor and editorial page director of the Star (1970–75). He left the Star in 1975 after a disagreement with Joe L. Allbritton, its new owner. He wrote a syndicated twice-weekly column, "Our Times," beginning 1975.

Hempstone worked as the Africa correspondent for The Chicago Daily News, wrote several books, and wrote a syndicated column carried by 90 newspapers. In 1982 he was named executive editor of the newly founded Washington Times and, following the resignation of editor and publisher James R. Whelan in 1984, briefly served as editor of the paper before being replaced by Arnaud de Borchgrave.

He was appointed ambassador to Kenya by George H. W. Bush in 1989, a time when the United States was beginning to push African countries toward democracy and human rights. Hempstone worked toward these goals by fighting for multiparty elections in Kenya in 1991, nine years after Kenyan president Daniel arap Moi had banned all parties except his own. The Moi administration derided him, saying he failed to understand that strong, unified government was necessary to keep Kenya's tribal groups from splitting the country. He aided dissidents and befriended opponents of the administration, causing the African press to describe his style as "bulldozer diplomacy." The Kenyan government isolated him and, according to Hempstone's book Rogue Ambassador: An African Memoir, twice attempted to kill him. Multiparty elections were ultimately held in 1992, and were won by Moi with 36 percent of the vote.

In 2001 former Kenyan government minister Nicholas Biwott successfully sued Hempstone (High Court Civil Suit Case No. 1273) for suggesting in his autobiography that Biwott had been involved in the murder of Kenya's minister of foreign Affairs, Dr. Robert Ouko, in February 1990. Hempstone did not defend the action.

Hempstone died in 2006 in Suburban Hospital, Bethesda, Maryland, from complications of diabetes.

Writings
Letters from Africa to the Institute of Current World Affairs, New York (1956)

 Africa: Angry Young Giant, Praeger, 1961 (published in England as The New Africa, Faber, 1961).
The New Africa (1961)

 Katanga Report, Faber, 1962
 Rebels, Mercenaries and Dividends: The Katanga Story, Praeger, 1962.
 A Tract of Time (novel), Houghton, 1966.
In the Midst of Lions (novel) (1968) -->
India in Focus: Six Articles (1964)
 In the Midst of Lions (novel), Harper, 1968.
United States Foreign Policy and the China Problem by Morton A. Kaplan, Douglas MacArthur, Smith Hempstone (1982)	
Chosin Marine: An Autobiography by Bill Davis, James H. Webb, Smith Hempstone (1986)
Rogue Ambassador: An African Memoir (1997)
 (Editor) STA, an Illustrated History of St. Albans School, Glastonbury Press, 1981.
Contributor to Saturday Evening Post, Atlantic Monthly, Reader's Digest, U.S. News & World Report, and other magazines.

Memberships
American Society of News Editors
Explorers Club

References

Sources

External links

Washington Post obituary
Kenyan tribute to Hempstone

1929 births
2006 deaths
20th-century American novelists
American columnists
American newspaper editors
Journalists from Washington, D.C.
American male novelists
Ambassadors of the United States to Kenya
Chicago Daily News people
The Washington Times people
United States Marine Corps officers
United States Marine Corps personnel of the Korean War
George H. W. Bush administration personnel
Culver Academies alumni
Sewanee: The University of the South alumni
George Washington University alumni
Harvard University alumni
Deaths from diabetes
American male non-fiction writers
20th-century American male writers